In computer science, a skew binomial heap (or skew binomial queue) is a variant of the binomial heap that supports constant-time insertion operations in the worst case, rather than the logarithmic worst case and constant amortized time of the original binomial heap. Just as binomial heaps are based on the binary number system, skew binary heaps are based on the skew binary number system.

References 

Priority queues
Heaps (data structures)